Elections to the Nagaland Legislative Assembly were held in November 1982 to elect members of the 60 constituencies in Nagaland, India. The United Democratic Front—Progressive alliance, led by the Indian National Congress won the most seats and S. C. Jamir was appointed as the Chief Minister of Nagaland for his second term. The number of constituencies was set as 60 by the recommendation of the Delimitation Commission of India.

Result

Elected Members

See also
List of constituencies of the Nagaland Legislative Assembly
1982 elections in India

References

1982 in Nagaland
Nagaland
State Assembly elections in Nagaland
1982